Kim Byung-soo (born November 24, 1970) is a former South Korean football manager and former player.

Club career
He played for Korea First Bank FC and Japanese sides Cosmo Oil Yokkaichi FC and Oita Trinita.

International career
He was a member of South Korea U-16 team at the 1987 FIFA U-16 World Championship. He was also in a squad of South Korea U-23 team for the 1992 Summer Olympics qualifications.

Coaching career
On 9 January 2017, he was appointed as manager of Seoul E-Land FC.

References

External links
 

1970 births
Living people
Association football midfielders
South Korean footballers
South Korean expatriate footballers
Korea National League players
Expatriate footballers in Japan
South Korean expatriate sportspeople in Japan
Korea University alumni
South Korea under-23 international footballers
South Korea international footballers
Seoul E-Land FC managers
South Korean football managers